Conflans-sur-Seine (literally Conflans on Seine) is a commune in the Marne department in north-eastern France.

Demography

See also
Communes of the Marne department

References

External links

 Conflans-sur-Seine sur le site de l'Institut Géographique National
 Conflans-sur-Seine on the INSEE website

Conflanssurseine